William E. Martin (October 8, 1945 – January 27, 2016) was an American musician, songwriter, screenwriter, and voice actor.

Life and career
A friend of Monkee Michael Nesmith, Martin wrote the first song ("All of Your Toys") to be recorded with all four Monkees singing and playing.   However, the song's copyright was owned by Tickson Music, for whom Martin worked; Screen Gems, who supervised music selection for the Monkees, had a rule that only Screen Gems-owned material could be released, and Tickson Music refused to sell the copyright. Martin took the setback in stride, signed a new contract with Screen Gems, and the band recorded his "The Door into Summer" (with title inspired by Robert A. Heinlein's novel).

A later teaming with singer-songwriter Harry Nilsson resulted in the song "Rainmaker", released in two different versions by Nilsson (on single and on LP) in 1969. Nilsson also covered some of Martin's songs, including "Fairfax Rag" and "City Life". Martin released a concept album in 1970, titled Bill Martin's Concerto for Head Phones and Contra-Buffoon in Asia Minor. It failed to sell. Shortly after their initial collaboration, Nilsson's film The Point would feature Martin's voice talent in the character of the Rockman.

Martin also wrote the song "Evergreen (Earth Anthem)", recorded by Cyrus Faryar, The Turtles, Dan Fogelberg and others.

Martin co-starred with Nesmith in his Grammy-winning Elephant Parts in 1981, and Nesmith also produced An Evening with Sir William Martin, with Martin delivering a half-hour monologue dressed in a smoking jacket and parodying Orson Welles, interspersed with different character voices.

Among Martin's screenwriting credits was the 1987 movie Harry and the Hendersons. Martin's first movie voice role came in the 1971 animated movie The Point as the Rock Man and later in the 1989 animated movie Little Nemo: Adventures in Slumberland as the villainous Nightmare King. He also had a cameo role in Hey, Hey, It's the Monkees, the 1997 television movie which reunited the full band.  He was the model for Bigfoot in Harry and the Hendersons.

His voice skills also earned him roles in numerous animated series, including Teenage Mutant Ninja Turtles (taking over the character of The Shredder after James Avery's departure from the role), Transformers, Challenge of the GoBots, and several Star Wars video games.

Death
He died on January 27, 2016, aged 70.

Filmography

Movies

Television

Videogames

References

External links

1945 births
Place of birth missing
2016 deaths
American male comedians
American male screenwriters
American male songwriters
The Monkees
American male voice actors